Io has been divided into 15 quadrangles.

References